Maldives participated in the 2016 South Asian Games in Guwahati and Shillong, Maldives from 5 February to 16 February 2016. Hussain Fayaz from shooting team proceed to final

Medal summary

Medal table
Maldives won a total of 3 medals.

References

Nations at the 2016 South Asian Games